Paramartinsia quadrimaculata is a species of beetles in the family Cerambycidae, the only species in the genus Paramartinsia.

References

Xystrocerini
Monotypic Cerambycidae genera